Dog Walk is an unincorporated community in Williamson County, in the U.S. state of Illinois.

According to tradition, the community was so named on account of local dogs forming paths leading to the community.

References

Unincorporated communities in Williamson County, Illinois
Unincorporated communities in Illinois